Trichohyalin is a protein that in mammals is encoded by the TCHH gene.

Discovery 
In 1903 the name trichohyalin was assigned to the granules of the inner root sheath (IRS) of hair follicles discovered by Hans Vörner. In 1986 the name was reassigned to a protein isolated from sheep wool follicles.

Gene location 
The human TCHH is located on the long (q) arm of chromosome 1 at region 2 band 1 sub-band 3 (1q21.3), from base pair 152,105,403 to base pair 152,116,368 (map). This region in chromosome 1q21 is known as the epidermal differentiation complex, since it harbors over fifty other genes involved in keratinocyte differentiation.

Gene coding sequence contains 5829 nucleotides. Gene orthologs were identified in most mammals including mice, chickens, rats, pigs, sheep, horses and other species.

Protein localisation 
Trichohyalin is highly expressed in the inner root sheath cells of the hair follicle and medulla. It was also detected in the granular layer and stratum corneum of normal epidermis, newborn human foreskin epidermis,  the hard palate, in the nail matrix, the filiform papillae of dorsal tongue epithelium and in rodent forestomach.

Function 
The protein forms frequent links between the heads and tails of the keratin chains and, thus, participates in keratin intermediate filaments (KIF) inter-filamentous cross-linking. It also carries a function of a major reinforcement cross-bridging protein for the cell envelope (CE) barrier structure of the IRS and participates in coordination of CE structure.

Overall, trichohyalin confers mechanical strength to the hair follicle inner root sheath and to other toughened epithelial tissues.

Structure 
Trichohyalin belongs to the S100-fused protein family. It is a monomer, containing 1943 amino acids, and has elongated (>200 nm) single-stranded alpha-helical conformation based on its unusually high content of charged residues.

Molecular mass of the human trichohyalin is 253925 Da.

The protein includes nine domains. Domain 1 contains two EF-hand calcium-binding domains.  Domains 2-4, 6, and 8 are almost entirely alpha-helical, configured as a series of peptide repeats of varying regularity, and are thought to form a single-stranded alpha-helical rod stabilised by ionic interactions. Domain 6 is the most regular and may bind KIF directly by ionic interactions. Domains 5 and 7 are less well organised and may induce folds in the molecule. Domain 9 contains the C-terminus, conserved among different species.

Post-translational modifications 

 Peptidylarginine deiminases (PAD) catalyse the deimination of arginine residues to citrullines.
 Cross-linking by transglutaminase (TGase) enzymes results in the formation of an isopeptide bond between peptide-bound glutamine and lysine residues and provide insolubility and the rigid structure to trichohyalin.

Interactions 
TCHH protein is extensively cross-linked to itself in the IRS tissue as well as to keratin intermediate filaments (KIF). All TCHH-keratin links involved only domain 6 or 8 sequences.

The protein can also form cross-links to all other CE proteins including involucrin, envoplakin, keratin, repetin, desmoplakin, SPR1, SPR2, and LEP.

TCHH-TCHH and TCHH-CE protein links are distributed among domains 2–5, but are uncommon in domains 6 and 8. Most intra-THH cross-links occurred in the least organised domain 5 region at a 3.5-fold higher frequency.

Clinical significance 
Trichohyalin is associated with uncombable hair syndrome, human alopecia areata and also may be linked to curly hair phenotype in Europeans.

A weak expression of the protein was discovered in the horny layer of psoriasis, ichthyosis, keratosis pilaris, porokeratosis, chronic dermatitis and callus. The same level of trichohyalin expression was found in epidermal tumours (seborrheic keratosis, actinic keratosis, Bowen's disease, well-differentiated squamous cell carcinoma) and follicular tumours (trichoepithelioma, keratotic basal cell epithelioma, proliferating trichilemmal tumour, trichilemmoma, pilomatricoma and keratoacanthoma).

References

Further reading 

 
 
 
 
 
 
 
 
 

S100 fused-type proteins